1,1,1,3,3,3-Hexachloropropane is a compound of chlorine, hydrogen, and carbon, with chemical formula , specifically . Its molecule can be described as that of propane with chlorine atoms substituted for the six hydrogen atoms on the extremal carbons.

History and properties 
There are 29 chlorinated derivatives of propane (four of them being hexachloropropanes, with the formula ). This was the last one of them to be synthesized—by A. W. Davis and A. M. Whaley—in 1950.

1,1,1,3,3,3-Hexachloropropane is a liquid that boils at 206 °C. Its boiling point is significantly higher than expected based on estimations from various molecular parameters.

Production 
The original synthesis by Davis and Whaley obtained the compound by reacting 1,1,3,3-tetrachloropropane and/or 1,1,1,3-tetrachloropropane with chlorine at 80-100 °C, through 1,1,1,3,3-pentachloropropane as an intermediate step.

The compound can be produced quantitatively also by reacting carbon tetrachloride  and 1,1-dichloroethene  at 80-150 °C, with a copper-based catalyst, such as copper(I) chloride or copper(II) chloride, and possibly an amine as co-catalyst. The same process can generate higher chlorinated alkanes of the form .

Applications 
The compound has been considered as an intermediate in the manufacture of 1,1,1,3,3,3-hexafluoropropane, through reaction with hydrogen fluoride.

Safety 
A 2001 study found that the compound had significant effects on rat fetuses when inhaled at 25 ppm. The LD (injection, rats) was found to be 827 mg/kg.

See also 
 1,1,2,2,3,3-Hexachloropropane
 1,1,1,3,3,3-Hexafluoropropane
 Octachloropropane
 1,1,1,3,3,3-Hexachloro-2,2-difluoropropane

References 

Chloroalkanes